Roosevelt Bala is the vocalist of the Brazilian heavy metal band "Stress". Bala was born in Belem, Brazil. He joined the band when it was called "Pingo d'agua" (English: drop of water) in 1976 as a vocalist.

Stress band 

The band was created in 1974 and named "Pingo d'agua" was the first Brazilian speed heavy metal band. The band was created when the band members were in their late teens and 20s. In 1977 it was renamed "Stress".

The current guitarist is Alex Magnum, André Chamon plays the drums, Bosco plays the bass and Bala is the vocalist and sometimes played the bass. The band conducts concerts around the world.

Discography

Albums 
Their albums include:
 Stress in 1982
 Flor atómica (English: Atomic flower) in 1985
 Stress III in 1996
 Amozon first metal attack in 2009
 Live n memory in 2009.

References 

20th-century Brazilian male singers
20th-century Brazilian singers
Living people
Year of birth missing (living people)
21st-century Brazilian male singers
21st-century Brazilian singers